The ninth season of the American comedy television series It's Always Sunny in Philadelphia premiered on the new channel FXX on September 4, 2013. The season consists of 10 episodes, and concluded airing on November 6, 2013. The ninth season was released on DVD in region 1 on September 2, 2014.

Cast

Main cast
 Charlie Day as Charlie Kelly
 Glenn Howerton as Dennis Reynolds
 Rob McElhenney as Mac 
 Kaitlin Olson as Dee Reynolds
 Danny DeVito as Frank Reynolds

Special guest cast
Seann William Scott as Country Mac

Recurring cast
 Mary Elizabeth Ellis as The Waitress
 David Hornsby as Cricket
 Artemis Pebdani as Artemis
 Lance Barber as Bill Ponderosa
 Jimmi Simpson as Liam McPoyle
 Nate Mooney as Ryan McPoyle
 Andrew Friedman as Jack Kelly
 Chad L. Coleman as Z
 Mary Lynn Rajskub as Gail the Snail
 Jessica Collins as Jackie Denardo

Guest stars
 Ken Davitian as Snyder
 Peter Jacobson as Rotenberg
 Robyn Lively as Kerry
 Dave Foley as Principal MacIntyre
 Jeff Kober as Creepy Guy
 Oscar Nunez as Sudz Manager
 Tommy Dewey as Harris Marder
 Roddy Piper as Da' Maniac
 Josh Groban as Himself
 Jim O'Heir as Doctor
 Jimmy Ouyang as Tang-See
 Burn Gorman as Scientist
 Zachary Knighton as Random Guy

Production
On August 6, 2011, FX announced it had picked up the show for a ninth season. It premiered on the new FXX channel and moved timeslots to Wednesday nights.

On May 14, 2013, Rob McElhenney revealed that Game of Thrones series creators David Benioff and D. B. Weiss guest-wrote an episode of the ninth season. Charlie Day revealed it would be a Flowers for Algernon type of story about "Charlie getting smarter" in a Limitless style, and is called "Flowers for Charlie".

In addition, there is an episode called "The Gang Tries Desperately to Win an Award", which mocks the show's lack of nominations for Emmys and other awards, a Lethal Weapon 6 episode follow-up, and a Thanksgiving special, which brings back Gail the Snail, The McPoyles and other enemies of the Gang. An animated sequence (inspired by a Pixar animation) was created for the 100th episode, "The Gang Saves the Day".

An Aaron Paul cameo was announced, but he was not able to appear due to scheduling conflicts.

Rob McElhenney revealed at the 2013 San Diego Comic-Con that he had written an episode for this season involving the gang becoming contestants on the game show Family Feud. While Family Feud producers were receptive to the storyline, FX refused to allow the episode to proceed to production.

The season premiered on September 4, 2013, and contains 10 episodes. The series' landmark 100th episode aired on October 9.

Ratings
The first episode of the season premiered with the lowest number of U.S. viewers since it has been tracked for the show. This was primarily due to the new channel, FXX, being unavailable from many television providers. Many Suddenlink Communications franchises, although carrying the channel, have required the subscriber to buy a "Sports Package" in order to receive the network. Nonetheless, FX Network president John Landgraf said that "the numbers last night [...] far exceeded our highest expectations" and that "To have just launched the channel three days ago and get these ratings is thrilling."

Episodes

Reception
The ninth season received positive reviews. On Rotten Tomatoes, it has an approval rating of 100% with an average score of 7.7 out of 10 based on 22 reviews. The website's critical consensus reads, "Dee hits rock bottom and Charlie gets smart in a consistently hilarious ninth season that proves the Gang doesn't need an award to be one of television's funniest ensembles."

Home media

References

External links 

 
 

2013 American television seasons
It's Always Sunny in Philadelphia